Tri Delta Transit, formally the Eastern Contra Costa Transit Authority, is a joint powers agency of the governments of Pittsburg, Antioch, Oakley, Brentwood, and Contra Costa County that provides bus service for the eastern area of Contra Costa County, California, United States. Tri Delta Transit local buses connect to the BART rapid transit system at Pittsburg/Bay Point and Concord. Tri Delta Transit buses also connect with County Connection bus service, WestCAT bus service, Delta Breeze bus service and Amtrak at shared bus stops.

Overview of fixed-route service 

Tri Delta Transit operates in eastern Contra Costa County and has stops in Antioch, Oakley, Brentwood, Byron, Discovery Bay, Bay Point, Pittsburg, Martinez, and Concord. Tri Delta Transit operates local and express routes on weekdays, local routes on weekends/holidays, and shuttle service to San Francisco 49ers home games.

Major transfer points for the majority of Tri Delta Transit's routes include:
 Brentwood Park & Ride in Brentwood
 Antioch BART Station in Antioch
 Pittsburg Center BART Station in Pittsburg
 Pittsburg/Bay Point BART Station in Pittsburg
 Los Medanos College in Pittsburg

Fleet Roster

List of fixed Tri Delta Transit bus routes 
Tri Delta Transit operates 21 bus lines at different times. On weekdays, 16 bus lines operate throughout cities of Pittsburg, Antioch, Oakley, Brentwood, and far-west of Martinez, California. On weekends, only 5 bus lines operate throughout cities of Pittsburg, Antioch, Oakley, and Brentwood only. Weekend bus-lines intend to be longer to cover segments of many weekday-bus lines. Even though most of the bus lines have the same terminus, various of them have their own ways of reaching their terminus.

Paratransit 
Paratransit is another transportation-mode that Tri Delta Transit operates. The paratransit transportation includes two programs; Individuals with ADA and Seniors (Age 65+) are eligible to ride this mode of transportation if they cannot independently ride fixed route Tri Delta bus service.

References

External links 

 
 Tri Delta Transit routes and descriptions

Bus transportation in California
Public transportation in Contra Costa County, California
Public transportation in Alameda County, California
1977 establishments in California
Government agencies established in 1977